Tyssøyna or Tyssøy is an island in Øygarden Municipality in Vestland county, Norway.   The  island lies in the northern part of the Raunefjorden.  The island has a population of about 70 and it is connected to the neighboring island of Bjorøy to the north via a short bridge.  Bjorøy is connected to the mainland by the Bjorøy Tunnel.  The island is named for the Norse god Týr. On the western side of the island is a wide and sheltered harbour called Tyssøyvågen. A narrow inlet leads into the harbour from the south, on the eastern side of the inlet several large soapstone rocks have tumbled down from the hillside. On one of these rocks the peculiar little "carving" is found. In the local community it is named "the crown" or "Tyssøykruna". Further inland on Tyssøy is a larger soapstone locality, bearing traces of being quarried for building material, most probably of a Medieval date. It seems likely that the quarrying activities at the two sites have taken place at the same time. This indicates that the earliest possible date for the figure at the inlet of Tyssøyvågen is the Middle Ages. 
Also during the Middle Ages (ca. 1305), the Norwegian king Haakon V built a royal chapel on the island. Remains of the chapel are still visible at a site called "Kyrkjesteinane".

See also
List of islands of Norway

References

Islands of Vestland
Øygarden